Aghajani is a surname. Notable people with the surname include:

Mahdyar Aghajani (born 1989), Iranian musician, record producer, and film composer
Saeed Aghajani, Iranian footballer

See also
Aghajani Kashmeri (1908–1998), Indian screenwriter, actor, and poet